David Proudfoot may refer to:
 David Proudfoot (engineer)
 David Proudfoot (trade unionist)